A gubernatorial election was held on 15 April 1967 to elect the Governor of Hokkaido Prefecture.

Candidates
Kingo Machimura - incumbent governor of Hokkaido Prefecture, age 66
 - Vice-chairman of the Hokkaido Prefectural Assembly, age 48
, age 61

Results

References

Hokkaido gubernational elections
1967 elections in Japan